Plestiodon nietoi is a species of lizard which is endemic to Mexico.

References

nietoi
Reptiles of Mexico
Reptiles described in 2012